Edward W. Gardner (1867 – January 26, 1932) of Passaic, New Jersey, was an American carom billiards champion in 1902, 1906, 1910, 1914 and 1916.

Biography
In 1914 he defeated Morris D. Brown and won the balkline championship by 400 to 386. He died on January 26, 1932, at Saint Vincent's Catholic Medical Center.

References

1867 births
1932 deaths